Kalubathan is a village in Kaliasole (also spelled Keliasole and Keliyasole) Gram panchayat and comes under Kaliasole (community development block) in Dhanbad Sadar subdivision of Dhanbad district of State Capital Ranchi in the Indian state of Jharkhand.

Kalubathan is surrounded by natural beauty and villages like Kaliasole, Simuldone, Kayrabank, Dainkata, Lakshipur, Patharkua, Dhobari, Urma, Dumurya, Daldali, Bandrabad is an admirable place with almost all the necessary facilities available.

Kalubathan Railway Station (station code: KAO) is situated in Kalubathan is an important Railway Station in the Eastern Railway zone of Asansol Division.

Demographics 
As per the 2011 Census of India, Kalubathan had a total population of 1206 of which 660 (55%) were males and 546 (45%) were females. Population below 6 years was 173. The total number of literates in Kalubathan was 770.

Gallery

References 

Villages in Dhanbad district